Tentulberia is a neighborhood of Garia, close to Kolkata, West Bengal, India. It is accessible from the Garia Station Road, Kolkata. New Garia railway station and Garia railway station of Kolkata Suburban Railway serve the area.

Places of interest
Namita Biswas Memorial Eye Hospital
Natun Radha Govindo Mandir Temple near Namita Biswas Eye Hospital
Das Bari Durga Dalan 
Milan Sangha Ground
Radha Gobinda Mandir
Jatrinibash with cafeteria with pay & use toilet near Garia railway station
Aurobindo Pally Kalyan Samity Club

Other public buildings

Schools
 Sitanath Sishu Siksha Mandir
 Anukul Chandra High School
 Nafar Chandra Balika Vidyalaya
 Sarada Sishu Tirtha
 Niharkana Primary School
 Manik Ghosal Primary School 
 Vidyabhavan School
 Giribala Primary School

Libraries
Desh Gaurav Pathagar
Pragati Path Bhavan

External links

Neighbourhoods in Kolkata